The black-crested tit-tyrant or Marañón tit-tyrant (Anairetes nigrocristatus) is a species of bird in the family Tyrannidae. It is found in Ecuador and Peru. Its natural habitats are subtropical or tropical moist montane forests and subtropical or tropical high-altitude shrubland.

Taxonomy
The black-crested tit-tyrant's genus, Anairetes, is believed to be most closely related to the genera Mecocerculus and Serpophaga; however, there is no definitive evidence supporting this claim. Members of the genus Anairetes are known commonly as tit-tyrants because their active foraging behavior and crests are reminiscent of the true tits in the family Paridae.

References

Cited texts
 

black-crested tit-tyrant
Birds of the Peruvian Andes
black-crested tit-tyrant
black-crested tit-tyrant
Taxonomy articles created by Polbot